HMS Sentinel was a S-class submarine of the third batch built for the Royal Navy during World War II. She was not completed until after the war and was sold for scrap in 1962.

Design and description
The last 17 boats of the third batch were significantly modified from the earlier boats. They had a stronger hull, carried more fuel and their armament was revised. They displaced  on the surface and  submerged. The S-class submarines had a crew of 48 officers and ratings.

For surface running, the boats were powered by two  diesel engines, each driving one propeller shaft. When submerged each propeller was driven by a  electric motor. They could reach  on the surface and  underwater.

Sentinel was armed with six 21 inch (533 mm) torpedo tubes in the bow. She carried six reload torpedoes for a grand total of a dozen torpedoes. Twelve mines could be carried in lieu of the torpedoes. The boat was also equipped with a 4-inch (102 mm) deck gun.

Construction and career
HMS Sentinel was built by Scotts of Greenock and launched on 27 July 1945. Commissioned after the Second World War, she had a peaceful career. In 1953 she took part in the Fleet Review to celebrate the Coronation of Queen Elizabeth II. Sentinel was sold on 28 February 1962, being broken up at Gillingham.

Notes

References
 
  
 
 
 

 

British S-class submarines (1931)
1945 ships
World War II submarines of the United Kingdom